The 1899 United States Senate election in New York was held on January 17, 1899. Incumbent Democratic Senator Edward Murphy Jr. stood for re-election to a second term but was defeated by Republican Chauncey Depew. Republicans had maintained control of both houses of the legislature in the 1898 New York state election.

Background

Democrat Edward Murphy, Jr. had been elected to this seat in 1893, and his term would expire on March 3, 1899.

At the State election in November 1898, 27 Republicans and 23 Democrats were elected for a two-year term (1899-1900) in the State Senate; and 88 Republicans and 62 Democrats were elected for the session of 1899 to the Assembly. The 122nd New York State Legislature met from January 4 to April 28, 1899, at Albany, New York.

Candidates

Republican caucus
The Republican caucus met on January 12. State Senator Hobart Krum presided. They nominated Chauncey M. Depew unanimously. Depew had been Secretary of State of New York from 1864 to 1865, and was the frontrunning candidate to succeed Thomas C. Platt at the U.S. Senate special election in 1881 when he withdrew after the 41st ballot. Parallel to his political career, he moved up the ladder in the Vanderbilt Railroad System, being President of the New York Central and Hudson River Railroad from 1885 to 1898, and holding positions in dozens of other railroad companies.

Democratic caucus
The Democratic caucus met also on January 12. State Senator George W. Plunkitt presided. They re-nominated the incumbent U.S. Senator Edward Murphy, Jr. unanimously.

Result

Chauncey M. Depew was the choice of both the Assembly and the State Senate, and was declared elected.

Note: The votes were cast on January 17, but both Houses met in a joint session on January 18 to compare nominations, and declare the result.

Aftermath

Depew was re-elected in 1905, and served two terms, most of the time alongside his adversary of 1881, Thomas C. Platt. Depew remained in the U.S. Senate until March 3, 1911. In 1911, Depew was defeated for re-election by Democrat James A. O'Gorman after a deadlock of two months and a half.

See also 

 United States Senate elections, 1898 and 1899

Sources

Members of the 56th United States Congress
MR. DEPEW FOR SENATOR in NYT on January 13, 1899
Senator Murphy Renominated in NYT on January 13, 1899
ELECTION OF MR. DEPEW in NYT on January 18, 1899

1899
United States Senate
New York